Marcelo Demoliner and Fabrício Neis were the defending champions but chose not to defend their title.

Steven de Waard and Ben McLachlan won the title after defeating Marin and Tomislav Draganja 6–7(7–9), 6–4, [10–7] in the final.

Seeds

Draw

References
 Main Draw

Internazionali di Tennis dell'Umbria - Doubles
2017 Doubles